Echinopsidine (Adepren) is an antidepressant that was under development in Bulgaria for the treatment of depression. It increases serotonin, norepinephrine, and dopamine levels in the brain and is believed to act as a monoamine oxidase inhibitor (MAOI). Echinopsidine is found naturally in Echinops echinatus along with the related alkaloids echinopsine and echinozolinone.

See also 
 Monoamine oxidase inhibitor

References 

Quinoline alkaloids